Noise-cancelling headphones reduce unwanted ambient sounds using active noise control. This is distinct from passive headphones which, if they reduce ambient sounds at all, use techniques such as soundproofing.

Noise cancellation makes it possible to listen to audio content without raising the volume excessively. It can also help a passenger sleep in a noisy vehicle such as an airliner. In the aviation environment, noise-cancelling headphones increase the signal-to-noise ratio significantly more than passive noise attenuating headphones or no headphones, making hearing important information such as safety announcements easier. Noise-cancelling headphones can improve listening enough to completely offset the effect of a distracting concurrent activity.

Theory

To cancel the lower-frequency portions of the noise, noise-cancelling headphones use active noise control or ANC. A microphone captures the targeted ambient sounds, and a small amplifier generates sound waves that are exactly out of phase with the undesired sounds. When the sound pressure of the noise wave is high, the cancelling wave is low (and vice versa). The opposite sound waves collide and are eliminated or "cancelled" (destructive interference). Most noise-cancelling headsets in the consumer market generate the noise-cancelling waveform in real time with analogue technology. In contrast, other active noise and vibration control products use soft real-time digital processing. According to an experiment conducted to test how lightweight earphones reduced noise as compared to commercial headphones and earphones, lightweight headphones achieved better noise reduction than normal headphones. The experiment also supported that in-ear headphones worked better at reducing noise than outer-ear headphones.

Cancellation focuses on constant droning sounds like road noise and is less effective on short/sharp sounds like voices or breaking glass. It also is ineffective in eliminating higher frequency noises like the sound of spraying. Noise-cancelling headphones often combine sound isolation with ANC to maximize the sound reduction across the frequency spectrum. Noise cancellation can also be used without sound isolation to make wanted sounds (such as voices) easier to hear. Noise cancellation to eliminate ambient noise is never passive because of the circuitry required, so references to passive noise cancellation actually are referring to products featuring sound isolation.

To prevent higher-frequency noise from reaching the ear, most noise-cancelling headphones depend on sound isolation or soundproofing. Higher-frequency sound has a shorter wavelength, and cancelling this sound would require locating devices to detect and counteract it closer to the listener's eardrum than is currently technically feasible or would require digital algorithms that would complicate the headphone's electronics.

Noise-cancelling headphones specify the amount of noise they can cancel in terms of decibels. This number may be useful for comparing products but does not tell the whole story, as it does not specify noise reduction at various frequencies.

In aviation 
By the 1950s, Dr. Lawrence Jerome Fogel created systems and submitted patents about active noise cancellation specifically in the field of aviation. This system was designed to reduce noise for the pilots in the cockpit area and help make their communication easier and protect hearing. Fogel is considered to be the inventor of active noise cancellation, and he designed one of the first noise-cancelling headphones systems. Later on, Willard Meeker designed an active noise control model that was applied to circumaural earmuffs for advanced hearing protection.  Noise-cancelling aviation headsets are now commonly available.

In 1989, Bose Corporation introduced its "Series I Aviation Headset" which became the first commercially available ANR headset. It included a noise-cancelling function and was powered either by NiCad batteries (with a claimed battery life of 8 hours) or by power from the aircraft.  Series I aviation headsets are distinguished by the clear windows on the earcups or by noting that the on/off switch and volume control are located on the separate control module.

Several airlines provide noise-cancelling headphones in their business and first-class cabins. Bose started supplying American Airlines with noise-cancelling headphones in 1999 and started offering the "Quiet Comfort" line for the general consumer in 2000. Noise cancelling is particularly effective against aircraft engine noise. In these cases, the headphones are about the same size as normal headphones.  The electronics, located in the plane hand rest, take the sound from the microphone behind the headphone, invert it, and add it back into the audio signal, which reduces background noise

As a sleeping aid 

Noise-cancellation headphones have been used as sleeping aids as well. Both passive isolating and active noise-cancellation headphones or earplugs help to achieve a reduction of ambient sounds, which is particularly helpful for people suffering from insomnia or other sleeping disorders, for whom sounds such as cars honking and snoring impact their ability to sleep. For that reason, noise-cancelling sleep headphones and ear plugs are designed to cater to this segment of patients.

In hospitals 
The use of noise-cancelling headphones for patients in intensive care units has been implemented to reduce the amount of noise exposure that they face while in a hospital environment. Active noise control technology is shown to have a relationship with sleep disturbance, delirium, and morbidity, therefore bringing up concerns about lowering the levels of noise for patients receiving care.

Health and safety 

There is a general danger that listening to loud music in headphones can distract the listener and lead to injury and accidents. Noise-cancelling headphones add extra risk. Several countries and states have made it illegal to wear headphones while driving or cycling.

It is not uncommon to get a pressure-like feeling when using noise-cancelling headphones initially. This is caused by the lack of low-frequency sounds as being perceived as a pressure differential between the inner and outer ear.

Autism 
A December 2016 study from the Hong Kong Journal of Occupational Therapy found that noise-cancellation headphones helped children with autism spectrum disorder cope with behaviours related to hyper-reactivity and auditory stimuli.

Drawbacks
Noise-cancelling headphones typically cost more than regular headphones. The active noise control requires power, usually supplied by a USB port or a battery that must occasionally be replaced or recharged. Without power, some models do not even function as regular headphones. Any battery and additional electronics may increase the size and weight of the headphones compared to regular headphones. The noise-cancelling circuitry may reduce audio quality and add high-frequency hiss, although reducing the noise may result in higher perceived audio quality.

See also 
Active vibration control
Noise-canceling microphone
Passive noise-cancelling headphones
Throat microphone

References

Audio engineering
Noise reduction